Mario Bolognini (died 25 February 1605) was a Roman Catholic prelate who served as Archbishop of Salerno (1591–1605), Archbishop (Personal Title) of Crotone (1588–1591), and Archbishop of Lanciano (1579–1588).

Biography
On 3 July 1579, Mario Bolognini was appointed during the papacy of Pope Gregory XIII as Archbishop of Lanciano.
On 5 July 1579, he was consecrated bishop by Giulio Antonio Santorio, Cardinal-Priest of San Bartolomeo all'Isola, with Fabio Mirto Frangipani, Titular Archbishop of Nazareth, and Gaspare Viviani, Bishop of Hierapetra et Sitia, serving as co-consecrators. 
On 3 October 1588, he was appointed during the papacy of Pope Sixtus V as Archbishop (Personal Title) of Crotone. 
On 7 January 1591, he was appointed during the papacy of Pope Gregory XIV as Archbishop of Salerno. He served as Archbishop of Salerno until his death on 25 February 1605.

While bishop, he was the principal co-consecrator of Alessandro Guidiccioni (iuniore), Bishop of Lucca (1600).

See also 
Catholic Church in Italy

References

External links and additional sources
 (for Chronology of Bishops) 
 (for Chronology of Bishops) 
 (for Chronology of Bishops) 
 (for Chronology of Bishops) 
 (for Chronology of Bishops) 
 (for Chronology of Bishops) 

Bishops appointed by Pope Gregory XIII
Bishops appointed by Pope Sixtus V
Bishops appointed by Pope Gregory XIV
1605 deaths